The 2018–19 Dhaka Premier Division Cricket League was an edition of the Dhaka Premier Division Cricket League, a List A cricket competition that was held in Bangladesh. It was the sixth edition of the tournament with List A status, although almost 35 seasons have been played before achieving the status. It started on 8 March, and concluded on 23 April 2019. Directly before the List A tournament started, the inaugural edition of the 2018–19 Dhaka Premier Division Twenty20 Cricket League took place, featuring the same twelve teams.

Abahani Limited were the defending champions. They won the tournament, finishing ahead of Legends of Rupganj on net run rate. It was their third List A title, and their 20th overall in the history of the competition. In their final match of the tournament, they beat Sheikh Jamal Dhanmondi Club by nine wickets. Soumya Sarkar scored 208 not out, the highest individual total in List A cricket in Bangladesh, and the first double century in List A cricket by a Bangladeshi batsman. Sarkar's innings also contained 16 sixes, also a record for a List A innings in Bangladesh. Sarkar and Jahurul Islam scored 312 runs for the opening wicket, which was another record for a List A match in Bangladesh.

Summary
Agrani Bank Cricket Club and Kala Bagan Krira Chakra were relegated in the previous tournament, and were replaced by Bangladesh Krira Shikkha Protishtan and Uttara Sporting Club in this edition of the competition. Ahead of the tournament, a players' draft took place.

The round seven fixture between Bangladesh Krira Shikkha Protishtan and Shinepukur Cricket Club ended in a tie. It was only the third tied match in since the competition achieved List A status for the 2013–14 tournament. The round eight fixture between Mohammedan Sporting Club and Brothers Union saw Mohammedan Sporting Club awarded the win, after Brothers Union refused to bat following a rain delay. Brothers Union assessed the pitch after the rain delay, saying that it was not possible to play on the wicket.

Following the conclusion of the group stage fixtures, Legends of Rupganj, Abahani Limited, Prime Bank Cricket Club, Prime Doleshwar Sporting Club, Mohammedan Sporting Club and Sheikh Jamal Dhanmondi Club had all qualified for the Super League section of the tournament. Meanwhile, Brothers Union, Bangladesh Krira Shikkha Protishtan and Uttara Sporting Club finished in the bottom three places in the table, and therefore moved to the Relegation League playoffs, with the bottom two teams being relegated to the Dhaka First Division Cricket League.

Bangladesh Krira Shikkha Protishtan were the first team to be relegated to the Dhaka First Division Cricket League, after they lost to Uttara Sporting Club by one wicket in their first Relegation League fixture. In the final match of the Relegation League phase, Brothers Union beat Bangladesh Krira Shikkha Protishtan by six wickets to ensure their survival, and relegating Uttara Sporting Club in the process. Old DOHS Sports Club and Partex Sporting Club were promoted from the First Division, replacing them for the next season.

Teams
The following teams competed in the tournament:

 Abahani Limited
 Bangladesh Krira Shikkha Protishtan
 Brothers Union
 Gazi Group Cricketers
 Khelaghar Samaj Kallyan Samity
 Legends of Rupganj
 Mohammedan Sporting Club
 Prime Bank Cricket Club
 Prime Doleshwar Sporting Club
 Sheikh Jamal Dhanmondi Club
 Shinepukur Cricket Club
 Uttara Sporting Club

Points tables

Group stage

 Team qualified for the Super League phase of the tournament

Super League

 Champions

Relegation League

 Team relegated to the Dhaka First Division Cricket League

Fixtures

Round robin

Round 1

Round 2

Round 3

Round 4

Round 5

Round 6

Round 7

Round 8

Round 9

Round 10

Round 11

Super League

Relegation League

References

External links
 Series home at ESPN Cricinfo

2018-19
Dhaka Premier Division Cricket League
Dhaka Premier Division Cricket League
Bangladeshi cricket seasons from 2000–01